Satatna, or Sitatna, and also Šutatna/Shutatna-(of a Babylonian letter of Burna-Buriash), was a 'Mayor'/Ruler of Akka, or Acco, modern Acre, Israel, during the 1350–1335 BC Amarna letters correspondence.

Satatna was the author of three letters to the Egyptian pharaoh, letters EA 233–235, (EA for 'el Amarna'). He is referenced in another minor vassal letter of Ruler: "Bayadi of Syria", and he is also referred to in EA 8, by Burna-Buriash as "..Šutatna, the son of Šaratum-(Surata) of Akka..."

A list of Satatna authored letters is as follows:
EA 233—title: "Work in progress"
EA 234—title: "Like Magdalu in Egypt". See: commissioner: Šuta.
EA 235—title: "An order for glass"

Satatna's Amarna letters

EA 233, "Work in progress"
Say to the king, [m]y [lord], the Sun from [the sky]: Message of Satatna the ruler of Akka, your servant, the servant of the king and the dirt at his feet and the ground on which he treads, I prostrate myself at the feet of the king, my lord, my god, the Sun from the sky, 7 times and 7 times, both on the stomach and on the back.  He is obeying what the king, my lord, has written to his servant, and preparing everything that my lord has order[ed].  —EA 233, lines 1-20 (complete)

EA 234, "Like Magdalu in Egypt"
See: Egyptian commissioner: Šuta.

EA 235, "An order for glass"
Say to the king, my lord, my Sun, my god, the Sun from the sky: Message of Sitatna, your servant, the dirt at your feet. (I  pr)ostrate myself at the feet of the king, my lord, my Sun, my god, 7 times and 7 times. ((at the feet of the king, my lord))-(emphasis-?). [I] have obeyed the [or]ders of the king's comm[issioner]  to me, to guard the citie[s f]or the king, my lord. I have guarded very carefully. M[oreover], the king, my lord has wri[tten] to me for glass, [and] I herewith send 50 (units), [their] weight-(i.e. I herewith send: "50–weight"), to the king, my lord.  —EA 235 (join of EA 327), lines 1-21 (complete)-(Note: reduces 382 Amarna letters to 381 (!))

See: Pu-Ba'lu for another letter concerning glass-(EA 314, "A shipment of glass"). Also see: Yidya, letter EA 323, "A royal order for glass".

See also
Pu-Ba'lu, glass letter
Yidya, glass letter
Amarna letters

References
Moran, William L. The Amarna Letters. Johns Hopkins University Press, 1987, 1992. (softcover)

Amarna letters writers
14th-century BC Phoenician people
14th-century BC rulers
Phoenicians in the Amarna letters